Coleophora bazae is a moth of the family Coleophoridae that is endemic to Spain.

The larvae feed on Atriplex glauca. They feed on the generative organs of their host plant.

References

External links

bazae
Moths described in 1978
Moths of Europe
Endemic fauna of Spain